92.5 Phoenix FM  (or Phoenix FM) is a community radio station that is licensed to broadcast in Dublin 15, Ireland. The "Dublin 15 Community Broadcasting Cooperative Society" was established in 1989. Phoenix FM received a licence to broadcast in 1999 from the Broadcasting Authority of Ireland and began broadcasting in 2000 from Blanchardstown Shopping Centre.

See also

 Blanchardstown
 CRAOL
 List of radio stations in the Republic of Ireland
 Broadcasting Authority of Ireland

References

External links 

 Phoenix 92.5FM
 CRAOL | The Community Radio Forum of Ireland
 Broadcasting Authority of Ireland / Údarás Craolacháin na hÉireann BAI.

Radio stations in Ireland